The 18th Annual Nickelodeon Kids' Choice Awards was held on April 2, 2005. The event was hosted by Ben Stiller and was held at Pauley Pavilion in Los Angeles.

Performers
Will Smith - "Switch"
Simple Plan - "Shut Up!"

Presenters
Cameron Diaz and Jimmy Fallon - Presented Favorite Movie Actor
Frankie Muniz and Jessica Alba - Presented Favorite TV Show
Jesse McCartney and Jamie Lynn Spears - Presented Favorite Cartoon
George Lopez and Alyssa Milano - Presented Favorite TV Actor
Hayden Christensen, C-3PO, Darth Vader and R2-D2 - Presented Favorite Male Singer
Drake Bell, Josh Peck and Ice Cube - Presented Favorite TV Actress
Halle Berry - Presented the Wannabe Award
Adam Brody and Amber Tamblyn - Presented Favorite Movie Actress
Amanda Bynes and Devon Werkheiser - Introduced Simple Plan
Chris Rock and Jada Pinkett Smith - Presented Favorite Voice from an Animated Movie

Winners and nominees
Winners are listed first, in bold. Other nominees are in alphabetical order.

Movies

Television

Music

Miscellaneous

Wannabe Award
Queen Latifah

References

External links
 
Nick.com

Nickelodeon Kids' Choice Awards
Kids' Choice Awards
Kids' Choice Awards
Kids' Choice Awards
2005 in Los Angeles
Kids